My Wife's Family may refer to

 My Wife's Family (play), a stage comedy by Fred Duprez 
 My Wife's Family (1941 film), a British comedy starring David Tomlinson
 My Wife's Family (1956 film), a British comedy starring Ronald Shiner and Ted Ray
 The Wife's Family, also known as My Wife's Family, a 1931 British comedy starring Gene Gerrard
 Shadows (1931 film), a 1931 British film sometimes known as My Wife's Family

See also
 Mother-in-Law's Coming, a 1932 Swedish comedy based on the same source as the above films
Voi meitä! Anoppi tulee, a 1933 Finnish comedy based on the same source as the above films
My Wife's Relations, a 1922 short film by Buster Keaton